Branko Lazić (born 12 January 1989) is a Serbian professional basketball player and captain for Crvena zvezda of the Adriatic League and the EuroLeague. He has also represented the senior Serbian national basketball team internationally. He has won a record six ABA League titles.

Professional career

FMP 
Lazić started his professional career in 2007 with a Belgrade-based team FMP. He played four seasons there, until 2011.

Crvena zvezda 
In 2011, Lazić signed a one-year contract with Crvena zvezda. On August 10, 2012, he signed a three-year extension with Crvena zvezda. On June 25, 2015, he signed a new two-year extension with Crvena zvezda. 

On February 7, 2017, Lazić became third player with most appearances of all time for Crvena zvezda passing Vuk Radivojević and Dragiša Vučinić. On July 13, Lazić signed a new two-year contract with the club and became the team captain after departure of former team captain Luka Mitrović. On February 12, 2018, Lazić played in his 430th game, passed Slobodan Nikolić, and became the player with most appearances in the Crvena zvezda history. On March 3, 2019, in a 70–68 win over Partizan, Lazić played in his 500th game for the Zvezda. On June 24, 2019, Lazić signed a three-year extension with Crvena zvezda. 

On January 18, 2021, Lazić made his 600th appearance for Crvena zvezda in a 79–77 win over Real Madrid. On December 19, 2021, Lazić passed Tadija Dragićević to become the Zvezda's ABA League all-time scoring leader.

Lazić was elected on 5-year term as a member of the Assembly of Crvena zvezda on 27 December 2021. In June 2022, he won his 20th major title with the Zvezda. On 13 July 2022, Lazić signed a two-year contract extension with the club.

National team career

In August 2017, head coach of the Serbia men's national basketball team Aleksandar Đorđević named Lazić as one of 12 players who represented Serbia at the EuroBasket 2017. They won the silver medal, after losing in the final game to Slovenia.

Career achievements
 Serbian League champion: 7  (with Crvena zvezda: 2014–15, 2015–16, 2016–17, 2017–18, 2018–19, 2020–21, 2021–22)
 Radivoj Korać Cup winner: 6  (with Crvena zvezda: 2012–13, 2013–14, 2014–15, 2016–17, 2020–21, 2021–22)
 Adriatic League champion: 6  (with Crvena zvezda: 2014–15, 2015–16, 2016–17, 2018–19, 2020–21, 2021–22)
 Adriatic Supercup winner: 1  (with Crvena zvezda: 2018)

Career statistics

Euroleague

|-
| style="text-align:left;"| 2013–14
| style="text-align:left;" rowspan=7| Crvena zvezda
| 10 || 8 || 14.3 || .474 || .429 || .833 || 1.3 || .7 || .1 || .0 || 2.6 || 1.8
|-
| style="text-align:left;"| 2014–15
| 19|| 13 || 17.8 || .394 || .345 || .750 || 1.5 || .7 || .6 || .1 || 3.9 || 2.7
|-
| style="text-align:left;"| 2015–16
| 26 || 11 || 19.3 || .430 || .410 || .875 || 1.3 || 1.0 || .9 || .0 || 4.3 || 2.9
|-
| style="text-align:left;"| 2016–17
| 30 || 6 || 23.6 || .467 || .368 || .571 || 2.2 || .3 || 1.4 || .1 || 4.4 || 4.0
|-
| style="text-align:left;"| 2017–18
| 30 || 21 || 20.4 || .324 || .259 || .944 || 2.0 || .9 || .8 || .1 || 3.3 || 2.5
|-
| style="text-align:left;"| 2019–20
| 25 || 25 || 16.3 || .406 || .292 || .667 || 1.3 || .6 || .6 || .0 || 3.9 || 1.8
|-
| style="text-align:left;"| 2020–21
| 33 || 33 || 16.4 || .369 || .354 || .909 || 1.3 || .7 || .6 || .0 || 2.7 || 1.6
|- class="sortbottom"
| style="text-align:center;" colspan=2| Career
| 173 || 117 || 18.8 || .401 || .336 || .788 || 1.6 || .7 || .8 || .1 || 3.6 || 2.5

See also 

 KK Crvena zvezda accomplishments and records
 List of KK Crvena zvezda players with 100 games played
 List of Serbia men's national basketball team players

References

External links
 Branko Lazić at aba-liga.com
 Branko Lazić at eurobasket.com
 Branko Lazić at euroleague.net
 

1989 births
Living people
ABA League players
Basketball League of Serbia players
KK Crvena zvezda players
KK FMP (1991–2011) players
Members of the Assembly of KK Crvena zvezda
Sportspeople from Loznica
Serbia men's national basketball team players
Serbian men's basketball players
Shooting guards
Small forwards